This is a list of American films released in 1971.

On April 10, 1972, at the 44th Academy Awards, The French Connection won the Academy Award for Best Picture. The other nominees were A Clockwork Orange, Fiddler on the Roof, The Last Picture Show and Nicholas and Alexandra.



A–B

C–G

H–M

N–S

T–Z

See also
 1971 in the United States

External links

 1971 films at the Internet Movie Database

1971
Films
Lists of 1971 films by country or language